Bath & Body Works, LLC. is an American retail store chain that sells soaps, lotions, fragrances, and candles. It was founded in 1990 in New Albany, Ohio and has since expanded across 6 continents. In 1997, it was the largest bath shop chain in the United States.

History
It was originally tested at The Westland Mall Limited Express Store, in Columbus, Ohio, before opening its first store.

Bath & Body Works was founded in 1990 in New Albany, Ohio. The company's first store opened in a Cambridge, Massachusetts mall in September 1990. In 1997, a secondary brand called Bath & Body Works at Home was launched. Two years later the company launched the White Barn Candle Company, a division specializing in the sale of scented candles.

Bath & Body Works launched both a seasonal catalog and a website in 2006. In November 2006, the company launched its first television commercial advertisement. Net sales as of January 28, 2006 were $2.3 billion, significantly higher than all other L Brands companies other than Victoria's Secret.

In July 2008, the company announced that it was opening six locations in Canada. With the company acquiring Canadian-based La Senza, they felt it was the opportunity to move into a growing Canadian market, with The Body Shop being its main competition. There are many stores in the east coast, it gained popularity in the malls.

Bath & Body Works operates more than 1,900 stores. In October 2010, it opened its first stores outside of North America in Kuwait, by the franchise giant M.H. Alshaya.

References

External links
 Bath & Body Works website
 Neil Fiske Article
 Diane Neal Article

Retail companies of the United States
Companies based in the Columbus, Ohio metropolitan area
Retail companies established in 1990
1990 establishments in Ohio
American corporate subsidiaries